German submarine U-4704 was a Type XXIII U-boat of Nazi Germany's Kriegsmarine during World War II. She was ordered on 7 July 1944, and was laid down on 9 November 1944 at Friedrich Krupp Germaniawerft AG, Kiel, as yard number 946. She was launched on 13 February 1945 and commissioned under the command of Leutnant zur See Gerhard Franceschi on 14 March 1945.

Design
Like all Type XXIII U-boats, U-4704 had a displacement of  when at the surface and  while submerged. The submarine was powered by one MWM six-cylinder RS134S diesel engine providing , one AEG GU4463-8 double-acting electric motor electric motor providing , and one BBC silent running CCR188 electric motor providing .

U-4704 was fitted with two  torpedo tubes in the bow. She could carry two preloaded torpedoes. The complement was 14–18 men. This class of U-boat did not carry a deck gun.

Service history
On 5 May 1945, U-4704 was scuttled in the  Hørup Hav, southeast of Sønderborg, as part of Operation Regenbogen. The wreck was later raised and broken up.

See also
 Battle of the Atlantic

References

Bibliography

External links

U-boats commissioned in 1945
World War II submarines of Germany
1945 ships
Type XXIII submarines
Ships built in Kiel
Operation Regenbogen (U-boat)
Maritime incidents in May 1945